Alexander "Pinkey" Hunt was a college football player for the Georgia Tech Yellow Jackets football team. He was a running back; the quarterback of the 1923 team. He scored the touchdown to beat Clemson in 1920. In 1922, he made Billy Evans's Southern Honor Roll.

See also 

 List of Georgia Tech Yellow Jackets starting quarterbacks

References

American football quarterbacks
American football fullbacks
Georgia Tech Yellow Jackets football players